Hamitabat power station is a gas-fired power station in Kırklareli Province northwestern Turkey, and is the oldest gas-fired power station of the country.

Technology 
Hamitabat is a combined cycle power plant.

Customers 
The plant supplies the Marmara region.

Finance 
Limak received capacity payments for the plant in 2020.

References 

Natural gas-fired power stations in Turkey
Buildings and structures in Kırklareli Province